The Silverliner V is an electric multiple unit railcar designed and built by Hyundai Rotem. It is used by Philadelphia's SEPTA Regional Rail and Denver, Colorado's Regional Transportation District. This is the fifth generation railcar in the Silverliner family of single level EMUs.

SEPTA Regional Rail
The cars feature expanded interiors and windows, additional entrances and screens used to display information about the service. They are all ADA compliant and meet Federal Railroad Administration safety requirements.

SEPTA ordered a total of 120 cars at a cost of $274 million; the first cars arrived in the United States on 28 February 2010 from South Korea, where they were manufactured by Hyundai Rotem. The cars were built in South Korea and final assembly took place in South Philadelphia. The cars entered revenue service on 29 October 2010 and all 120 were to be completed by the end of 2011. However, due to delays that were reportedly to last until mid-2012, SEPTA is owed millions in fines for the overdue equipment. SEPTA also closed off the very front row of seats due to safety concerns.

The last of the 120 cars arrived on property for testing in February 2013.

Cars 735, 736, 871 and 872 are owned by the state of Delaware. However, they are used systemwide for service, and are not restricted to use on services to Delaware only.

On July 2, 2016, SEPTA removed all 120 of its Silverliner V cars – a third of its fleet – from service due to fatigue cracks in the trucks, leading to reduced service system-wide. The agency received some of the trains back in September 2016; but subsequently withdrew 18 cars after an additional defect was identified – a “clearance issue” that led to occasional contact between old and new components. SEPTA announced that it could resume normal schedules on October 3 and would receive all trains by November 2016.

RTD Commuter Rail
In 2010 Denver's Regional Transportation District selected the Silverliner V for its new commuter rail line. A total of 66 cars were purchased in the married pair configuration for a total of $300 million. The first four cars were delivered to Denver on December 3, 2014 with service to start in 2016. As of 2020, Silverliner V trains are used on the RTD's A, B, G and N lines.

Differences between the RTD and SEPTA cars include support for only 25 kV 60 Hz AC electrification, two center opening high level doors per side, less powerful traction motors, full-width cabs, and bells.

Electromagnetic interference

Some users of audio equipment have found that the presence of tracks carrying Silverliner V cars have introduced detrimental electromagnetic interference to playback and recording of audio. This phenomenon also affects audio and PA electronics inside the cars, although Hyundai Rotem has fitted filters to lessen the effect on internal equipment.

References

External links

Silverliner V RFP Technical Specification
SEPTA Silverliner V Page
Image of the operating cab
RTD Variant Fact Sheet

SEPTA Regional Rail
Passenger rail transportation in Pennsylvania
Rail passenger cars of the United States
Train-related introductions in 2010
Electric multiple units of the United States
Hyundai Rotem multiple units
RTD commuter rail
25 kV AC multiple units